Mohammad Emon is a Bangladeshi footballer who plays as a centre back or right back for Bangladeshi club Sheikh Jamal DC and the Bangladesh national team.

Emon also represented Bangladesh U19 in 2016 AFC U-19 Championship qualification. His childhood idol is World Cup winning defender Sergio Ramos, who also plays as a centre back.

International career

Youth
In October 2015, Emon played in 2016 AFC U-16 Championship qualification for Bangladesh U19 national team. He started Bangladesh's all the three matches in the tournament.

Senior
On 9 March 2021, Emon received his first senior national team call-up ahead of Three Nations Cup tournament in Nepal. On 27 March, he started against Nepal in a 0–0 draw and made his international debut.

References

External links 
 
 

Living people
1997 births
Footballers from Dhaka
Bangladeshi footballers
Association football defenders
Muktijoddha Sangsad KC players
Sheikh Russel KC players
Sheikh Jamal Dhanmondi Club
Bangladesh Football Premier League players
Bangladesh international footballers